Frederick J. Mavin (listed in some sources as Fred Maven, 1884–1957) was an English professional footballer and manager. He began his career at Newcastle United, but did not make a first team appearance. In 1905 he signed for New Brompton.  He subsequently played for Fulham, Bradford Park Avenue and Reading between 1909 and 1921, and managed Exeter City from 1923 to 1927, Crystal Palace from 1927 to 1930 and Gillingham from 1932 to 1937.

References

1884 births
1957 deaths
Footballers from Newcastle upon Tyne
Fulham F.C. players
Bradford (Park Avenue) A.F.C. players
Reading F.C. players
Gillingham F.C. players
Gillingham F.C. managers
Exeter City F.C. managers
Crystal Palace F.C. managers
English football managers
English footballers
Association footballers not categorized by position